ACS Nano is a monthly, peer-reviewed, scientific journal, first published in August 2007 by the American Chemical Society. The current editor in chief is Xiaodong Chen (Nanyang Technological University). The journal publishes original research articles, reviews, perspectives, interviews with distinguished researchers, and views on the future of nanoscience and nanotechnology.

Scope
The focus of ACS Nano is synthesis, assembly, characterization, theory, and simulation of nanostructures, nanotechnology, nanofabrication, self assembly, nanoscience methodology, and nanotechnology methodology. The focus also includes nanoscience and nanotechnology research – the scope of which is chemistry, biology, materials science, physics, and engineering.

Abstracting and indexing
ACS Nano is indexed in the following databases: 

Chemical Abstracts Service – CASSI
Chemistry Citation Index
Current Contents – Physical, Chemical & Earth Sciences
Materials Science Citation Index
Science Citation Index
Scopus
MEDLINE/PubMed
Nature Index

References

External links
 

Nano
Nanotechnology journals
Monthly journals
English-language journals
Publications established in 2007